Körfuknattleiksdeild Keflavíkur is Keflavík ÍF's basketball subdivision and can refer to:
 Keflavík men's basketball
 Keflavík women's basketball